Air Force Base Makhado , formerly Air Force Base Louis Trichardt, is an airbase of the South African Air Force. It is the SAAF's northernmost base, situated at Louis Trichardt near the border with Zimbabwe, as well as being its most modern, and is known unofficially as Fighter Town, RSA.

The base motto is Castrum Borealis (Fortress of the North).

Units hosted
 2 Squadron – Fighter squadron
 85 Combat Flying School
 102 Squadron – Light transport (reserve)
 515 Squadron – Security services
 3 Air Servicing Unit – Maintenance support

History
The base was officially opened on 14 October 1987 as AFB Louis Trichardt, but changed its name to match that of the nearby town on 7 November 2003. The town has since reverted to its old name, but the base name remains unchanged. The base uses cheetahs to control wildlife.

See also
 List of longest runways

References

External links
Official site 

Airports in South Africa
South African Air Force bases
Transport in Limpopo
Vhembe District Municipality